The Massacre of Tranent took place on 29 August 1797 in the town of Tranent, East Lothian, Scotland.

Proclamation 
On 28 August a proclamation was drawn up by local people to object to the conscription of Scots into the British Militia, to be used either for controlling their own people or for deployment elsewhere.  The proclamation comprised four clauses:-

 We declare that we unanimously disapprove of the late Act of Parliament for raising 6000 militiamen in Scotland.
 We declare that we will assist each other in endeavouring to repeal the said Act.
 We declare that we are peaceably disposed; and should you, in endeavouring to execute the said Act, urge us to adopt coercive measures, we must look upon you to be the aggressors, and as responsible to the nation for all the consequences that may follow.
 Although we may be overpowered in effecting the said resolution, and dragged from our parents, friends, and employment, to be made soldiers of, you can infer from this what trust can be reposed in us if ever we are called upon to disperse our fellow-countrymen, or to oppose a foreign foe.

Encouragement 
This measure may have been encouraged or incited by the United Scotsmen, a secret society spread throughout Scotland who were believed to be intent on insurgence and the setting up of a Scottish government under Muir of Huntershill. It is believed they had been involved in similar protests elsewhere over the 1797 Militia Act.

Day of the incident 
The following day, 29 August, the proclamation was handed to Major Wight, the commanding officer of the recruitment squad; it was initially ignored. Later, when a contingent from the local colliery communities, led by 'Jackie' (Joan) Crookston confronted the troops, their response was swift and bloody. Several of the protesters, including Crookston, were shot dead out of hand.

The protesters fled from the centre of the small town into the countryside, pursued by the Cinque Port Light Dragoons, who are reported to have cut down people indiscriminately, caring little whether they were involved in the protest or not.  Casualty estimates range from around a dozen to twenty or more men, women and children dead, with more injured.

After the slaughter the troopers are alleged to have carried out rapes and pillage in the small town.

Reactions 
The Light Dragoons' overall commanding officer was then Colonel Viscount Hawkesbury, (later 2nd Earl of Liverpool, a future British Prime Minister) who was not present. It was reported that "His lordship was blamed for remaining at Haddington, as his presence might have prevented the outrages of the soldiery."

Memorial 

A statue by sculptor David Annand, of Jackie Crookston and one of the children, was unveiled in Tranent centre in 1995.

References

Further reading 
"The Lion in the North" John Prebble
"Scotland's Story" Tom Steel
"Prestonpans and Vicinity" Peter McNeill
"The Tranent Massacre" Sandy Mullay (East Lothian District Library, 1997)

Conflicts in 1797
1797 crimes in Europe
1797 in Scotland
History of East Lothian
Tranent
Tranent
Political repression in the United Kingdom
Riots and civil disorder in Scotland
Conscription in the United Kingdom
 
Tranent
Massacres in 1797